The Benevento dialect is a vernacular variety from the Campanian dialect that has undergone an evolution in a restricted space, roughly corresponding to the territory of the pontifical exclave of Benevento; this vernacular is placed side by side with other similar linguistic types referable to the same lineage and, in terms of phonetics, morphology and lexicon, it differs in some respects from Neapolitan.

Grammar 
In this dialect, the final unstressed vowels of nouns tend to be reduced, such as the o which becomes a schwa. Adjectives and predicates in -ato or -oso generally tend to change the ending -uto and -uso. The ending of the infinitive of the verbs of the 1st conjugation instead of -are is almost always -ane, as in fravecàne ("to work"), stàne ("to be"), parlàne ("to speak"); the infinitives in -ere with -e tonic of the 2nd conjugation and in -ire of the 3rd undergo truncation, as in cadé ("to fall"), vedé ("to see"), sentì ("to hear"; often also hears, equal in third person singular form of the present ind.), morì ("to die"); while the infinitives in -ere with -e unstressed of the 2nd conjugation lose the last syllable: credere, scendere, correre, rompere, dire are realized like crede, scenne (with progressive assimilation of the second element of the nexus -nd-> -nn -, as in the southern dialects occurs in the case of when > quanno), it corre, rompe, dice (the direct derivation from the Latin dicěre is evident).

 sòrdo instead of soldo;
 salmento instead of sarmento;
 surdo instead of sordo;
 salda instead of sarda.

Each dialect tends to gravitate around a center of irradiation of innovation, which generally coincides with the administrative or commercial capital, while the peripheral areas tend to retain features of relative archaism.

References

Bibliography 

 Antonio Iamalio. La Regina del Sannio, descrizione coretnografica e storica della Provincia di Benevento. Naples, Ardia, 1918.
 Gerhard Rohlfs. Grammatica storica della lingua italiana e dei suoi dialetti. In 3 voll. Turin, Enaudi, 1966–1969.
 Salvatore De Lucia. Benevento nelle tradizioni popolari. Benevento, 1975.
 Manfredi Del Donno. Dizionario storico etimologico di voci dialettali del Sannio beneventano. Naples, 1984.
 Salvatore Nittoli. Vocabolario dei vari dialetti del Sannio, in rapporto con la lingua italiana. Naples, 1873. Rist. Bologna, 1984.
 Manfredi Del Donno. Il dialetto di Benevento. 1991.
 Edgar Radtke. I dialetti in Campania. Roma, Il Calamo, 1997.
 Salvatore Tambascia, Grammatica e lessico del dialetto Castelvetrese, Rome, Il Calamo, 1998.
 Pietro Maturi. Dialetti e substandardizzazione nel Sannio beneventano. Frankfurt, Lang, 2002.

Dialects of Italian
Languages of Campania
Benevento